Robert William Dixey Trevelyan (born 28 November 1970) is an English former first-class cricketer

The son of The Reverend Robert James Willam Irvine Trevelyan and Felicity Jane Gibson, he was born at Folkestone in November 1970. He later studied at Pembroke College, Oxford where he played first-class cricket for Oxford University in 1990. Trevelyan's three appearances came against county opponents in the form of Glamorgan and Nottinghamshire, in addition to playing against Cambridge University in The University Match. Playing as a wicket-keeper, he failed to score any runs in his three matches.

References

External links

1970 births
Living people
People from Folkestone
Alumni of Pembroke College, Oxford
English cricketers
Oxford University cricketers